The Hunter River, informally nicknamed the "River Clyde", is a Canadian river in northwestern Queens County, Prince Edward Island.

It discharges into the Gulf of St Lawrence.

The river runs through the communities of Hunter River, New Glasgow and North Rustico. There was at one time a ferry at Hunter River and the river was dammed in at least two locations to power mills. The headponds are still in existence.

The watershed covers approximately 9,000 hectares (22,000 acres).

The local Hunter-Clyde Watershed Group was established in 2000 to improve and maintain the health of the watershed's ecosystem.

See also
List of rivers of Prince Edward Island

References

External links
 Hunter-Clyde Watershed Group

Rivers of Prince Edward Island